Paul Mitchell may refer to:

Sports
 Paul Mitchell (American football) (1920–2017), American football player
 Paul Mitchell (athlete) (born 1970), Australian Paralympian
 Paul Mitchell (baseball) (born 1949), American baseball player
 Paul Mitchell (broadcaster) (born 1968), Scottish sports broadcaster
 Paul Mitchell (cricketer) (born 1975), Zimbabwean cricketer
 Paul Mitchell (footballer, born 1971), English footballer
 Paul Mitchell (footballer, born 1981), English footballer

Others
 Paul Mitchell (hairdresser) (1936–1989), Scottish hairstylist and cofounder of John Paul Mitchell Systems
 The products of John Paul Mitchell Systems, are also often labelled "Paul Mitchell"
 Paul Mitchell (politician) (1956–2021), American politician
 Paul Mitchell (writer), Australian author
 Paul Mitchell, member of American R&B vocal group the Floaters